The Language and Literature Bureau (DBP) is the Bruneian language authority of the country's official language Malay. It is also the operator of public libraries in the country. It was established in 1960 and is now a government department under the Ministry of Culture, Youth and Sports.

History 
The establishment of the bureau began with the approval of a motion during a State Legislative Council meeting on 18 April 1960. The motion was to establish an independent body answerable to the government with the function of consolidating the status of Malay as the official language of Brunei, as enacted in the Constitution which was promulgated in the previous year. However, it was later renamed to Bahagian Bahasa dan Pustaka (Language and Literature Section) in 1962. At the time it was established under the authority of Jabatan Pelajaran or the Department of Education, the predecessor to the Ministry of Education. On 1 January 1965, it was made into a separate department and eventually adopted its current name. In 1984, Dewan Bahasa dan Pustaka Brunei was subsumed under the authority of the Ministry of Culture, Youth and Sports.

Dictionary and other publications 
Dewan Bahasa dan Pustaka Brunei publishes Kamus Bahasa Melayu Brunei, the official dictionary of the Brunei Malay language, the de facto lingua franca in Brunei. The dictionary was first published in 1991 and it is currently in its second edition, with entries over 15,000.

The Dewan also publishes four journals, namely Bahasa, Beriga, Pangsura and Undang-Undang Syariah, as well as three magazines, namely Bahana, Juara Pelajar and Mekar.

Public libraries 

Dewan Bahasa dan Pustaka Brunei operates all public libraries in the country, which include:
 Bandar Seri Begawan Library
 Sengkurong Library
 Muara Library
 Lambak Kanan Library
 Tutong District Library
 Kuala Belait Library
 Kampong Pandan Library
 Seria Library
 Temburong District Library

References

External links 
 Gerbang Bahasa | Dewan Bahasa dan Pustaka Brunei website 
 Dewan Bahasa dan Pustaka Brunei website 
 Ministry of Culture, Youth and Sports website 

Language regulators
Malay language
Government of Brunei
1960 establishments in Brunei